The half diminished scale or Sisyphean Scale is a seven-note musical scale. It is more commonly known as the Locrian 2 scale, a name that avoids confusion with the diminished scale and the half-diminished seventh chord (minor seventh, diminished fifth). It is the sixth mode of the ascending form of the melodic minor scale (or jazz scale).

In the key of B, the half-diminished scale built on C is associated with Cm75, which functions as a ii7 chord in minor (see chord-scale system).

References

Heptatonic scales
Modes (music)
Hemitonic scales
Tritonic scales